Lefroy Airport  was located  north of Lefroy, Ontario, Canada.

References

Defunct airports in Ontario